The Great White Trail is a surviving 1917 American silent drama film produced and directed by Leopold Wharton and starring Doris Kenyon.

Cast
Doris Kenyon as Prudence Carrington
Paul Gordon as George Carrington
Thomas Holding as Reverend Arthur Dean
Hans Roberts as Charles Ware
Louise Hotaling as Marie
F. W. Stewart as The Vulture (credited as Richard Stewart)
Edgar L. Davenport as Donald Ware (credited as Edgar Davenport)
Dick Bennard as Grocer boy
Bessie Wharton as Marie's Guardian

References

External links

Lobby poster

1917 films
American silent feature films
Films based on short fiction
Films directed by Leopold Wharton
1917 drama films
American black-and-white films
Silent American drama films
1910s American films